Vladimiras Dubeneckis  (6 September 1888 – 10 August 1932) was a Lithuanian architect and painter.

See also
List of Lithuanian painters

References
Universal Lithuanian Encyclopedia

1888 births
1932 deaths
20th-century Lithuanian painters
Burials at Petrašiūnai Cemetery